Digha Assembly constituency is one of 243 legislative assembly constituencies of the legislative assembly of Bihar in India.  It comes under Patna Sahib (Lok Sabha constituency). It came into existence in 2008 after delimitation. Digha assembly constituency has six panchayats and 21 wards of Patna Municipal Corporation.  Digha is Bihar's largest assembly constituency having 400 booths with around 4 lakh voters. In 2015 Bihar Legislative Assembly election, Digha was one of the 36 seats to have VVPAT enabled electronic voting machines.

Overview

Digha comprises:
 Gram Panchayat Nakta Diyara, Ward Nos. 1, 2, 3, 6,
 Pataliputra Housing Colony (OG) – Ward No. 38 & Digha-Mainpura (OG) Ward No. 39, 
 Badalpura (OG) Ward No. 40, 
 Sabazpura (OG) Ward No. 41 & Khalilpura (OG) Ward No. 42 in Patna (MC + OG) of Patna Rural CD Block.

Members of Legislative Assembly

Election results

2020

See also
 List of constituencies of Bihar Legislative Assembly
 Digha, Patna

References

Assembly constituencies in Patna district
Politics of Patna district
Assembly constituencies of Bihar